Twilight Tear (1941–1954) was an American Hall of Fame Thoroughbred racehorse. At age two, she won four of her six starts, finishing second and third in her other two starts. Her performances earned her the title of 2-year-old filly honors in a poll by Turf and Sports Digest magazine. The rival Daily Racing Form award was won by Durazna.

At three, Twilight Tear won fourteen out of seventeen races including eleven straight, beating both fillies and colts. In the prestigious Pimlico Special she defeated Devil Diver and Kentucky Derby and Preakness Stakes winner Pensive in a time that matched the record set by Seabiscuit in the 1938 race. Her dominating performance in 1944 saw her named Horse of the Year by both the Daily Racing Form and the Turf and Sport Digest. In the latter poll she received 121 of the possible 154 votes, with the second-placed Pavot receiving 20.

In her first race at age four, Twilight Tear suffered respiratory tract problems and was retired to stand as a broodmare at Calumet Farm.

In a poll among members of the American Trainers Association, conducted in 1955 by Delaware Park, she was voted the second greatest filly in American racing history.  (Gallorette was voted first.)

References

 Twilight Tear at the National Museum and Racing Hall of Fame
 Twilight Tear's pedigree and stats

1941 racehorse births
1954 racehorse deaths
Racehorses bred in Kentucky
Racehorses trained in the United States
American Thoroughbred Horse of the Year
United States Thoroughbred Racing Hall of Fame inductees
Thoroughbred family 23-b